In mathematics, the Hall algebra is an associative algebra with a basis corresponding to isomorphism classes of finite abelian p-groups. The Hall polynomials are the structure constants of  the Hall algebra. The Hall algebra plays an important role in the theory of Masaki Kashiwara and George Lusztig regarding canonical bases in quantum groups.  generalized Hall algebras to more general categories, such as the category of representations of a quiver.

Construction 
A finite abelian p-group M is a direct sum of cyclic p-power components  where
 is a partition of  called the type of M.  Let  be the number of subgroups N of M such that N has type  and the quotient M/N has type .  Hall proved that the functions g are polynomial functions of p with integer coefficients. Thus we may replace p with an indeterminate q, which results in the Hall polynomials 

 

This ring has a basis consisting of the symbols  and the structure constants of the multiplication in this basis are given by the Hall polynomials: 

It turns out that H is a commutative ring, freely generated by the elements  corresponding to the elementary p-groups. The linear map from H to the algebra of symmetric functions defined on the generators by the formula

 

(where en is the nth elementary symmetric function) uniquely extends to a ring homomorphism and the images of the basis elements  may be interpreted via the Hall–Littlewood symmetric functions. Specializing q to 0, these symmetric functions become Schur functions, which are thus closely connected with the theory of Hall polynomials.

References

 George Lusztig, Quivers, perverse sheaves, and quantized enveloping algebras, Journal of the American Mathematical Society 4 (1991), no. 2, 365–421.
 
 

Algebras
Invariant theory
Symmetric functions